The Chief of Naval Research is the senior military officer in charge of scientific research in the United States Navy.  The Chief of Naval Research has a rank of Rear Admiral, and is in charge of the Office of Naval Research.

The Chief of Naval Research has responsibility for basic research, applied research, and advanced technology development components of the Navy's research and development programs (the first three of the seven categories used in the Department of Defense research and development budget, often referred to as 6.1, 6.2, and 6.3, respectively), as well as the Navy's intellectual property policy.  The Chief of Naval Research also coordinates with other research and development agencies within the Department of the Navy, such as the Naval Warfare Centers of the Naval Systems Commands.

Other positions in the Office of Naval Research leadership include the Vice Chief of Naval Research (a one-star Marine Corps brigadier general), the Assistant Chief of Naval Research and Commanding Officer of ONR Global (both captains), and the Executive Director and Assistant Vice Chief of Naval Research (both civilians).  The Chief of Naval Research reports directly to the civilian Assistant Secretary of the Navy (Research, Development, and Acquisition), and is thus not organizationally subordinate to the Chief of Naval Operations, the senior military officer in the entire Navy.

History
The predecessor to the Office of Naval Research was the Office of the Coordinator of Research and Development, an institution within the Navy during World War II meant to coordinate between the military-wide Office of Scientific Research and Development (OSRD), Navy materiel bureaus, and civilian research organizations.  The organization was formed in 1941 and was nicknamed the "Bird Dogs" due to their skill at finding and solving interorganizational problems.  Jerome Clarke Hunsaker was interim chief, followed by Rear Admiral Julius A. Furer.  OSRD was disbanded after the war, and the Office of the Coordinator of Research and Development was incorporated into the new Navy Office of Research and Inventions, headed by Harold Bowen, which became the Office of Naval Research in 1945.

List of Chiefs of Naval Research

 1st: Harold G. Bowen Sr. (1946–1947)
 2nd: Paul F. Lee (1947–1949)
 3rd: Thorvald A. Solberg (1949–1951)
 4th: Calvin Matthews Bolster (1951–1953)
 5th: Frederick R. Furth (1953–1956)
 6th: Rawson Bennett II (1956–1961)
 7th: Leonidas Dixon Coates, Jr. (1961–1964)
 8th: John Leydon (1964–1968)
 9th: Thomas Barron Owen (1968–1970)
 10th: Carl O. Holmquist (1970–1973)
 11th: M. Dick Van Orden (1973–1975)
 12th: Robert Keith Geiger (1975–1978)
 13th: Albert Baciocco (1978–1981)
 14th: L. S. Kollmorgen (1981–1983)
 15th: Brad Mooney (1983–1987)
 16th: John R. Wilson, Jr. (1987–1990)
 17th: William C. Miller (1991–1993)
 18th: Marc Y. E. Pelaez (1993–1996)
 19th: Paul G. Gaffney II (1996–2000)
 20th: Jay M. Cohen (2000–2006)
 21st: William E. Landay III (2006–2008)
 22nd: Nevin P. Carr, Jr. (2008–2011)
 23rd: Matthew L. Klunder (2011–2014)
 24th: Mathias W. Winter (2014–2016)
 25th: David J. Hahn (2016–2020)
 26th: Lorin C. Selby (2020–present)

References

Flag appointments of the United States Navy
Military science